Judge Carter may refer to:

Canada
George Ethelbert Carter (1921–2018), judge of the Ontario Court of Justice, first Canadian-born black judge
Mary Carter (judge) (1923–2010), judge of the Court of Queen's Bench for Saskatchewan

United States
James Marshall Carter (1904–1979), judge of the United States Court of Appeals for the Ninth Circuit 
Oliver Jesse Carter (1911–1976), judge of the United States District Court for the Northern District of California
Robert L. Carter (1917–2012), judge of the United States District Court for the Southern District of New York
Gene Carter (1935–2021), senior judge of the United States District Court for the District of Maine
David O. Carter (born 1944), judge of the United States District Court for the Central District of California
Andrew L. Carter Jr. (born 1969), judge of the United States District Court for the Southern District of New York

See also
Justice Carter (disambiguation)
Carter (surname)